Whiteman Park railway station is a proposed bus and railway station on the Morley–Ellenbrook railway line in Perth, Western Australia as part of Metronet, serving Whiteman Park and the suburbs of Henley Brook, Dayton, West Swan, and Brabham.

History
During early planning, an alternative alignment of the Morley-Ellenbrook line in the Tonkin Highway median west of Whiteman Park was considered, but the lack of a station to service the Whiteman Park entrance for tourism, nor the growing nearby suburbs of Henley Brook, Dayton, Brabham, and West Swan, was considered undesirable.

Station design
Whiteman Park station will be located just south of the Drumpellier Drive entrance to the park. It will include a bus interchange with 10 stands, providing efficient transport links to surrounding suburbs, including the Swan Valley tourist area. The station will also include 900 car bays and two bike shelters, as well as lifts, escalators, toilets and a kiosk.

The station will feature a  island platform, over half of which will be sheltered. The platforms will be elevated through the combination of an embankment and an overpass structure, while the entrance will be at ground level and connected to an underpass under the railway and Drumpellier Drive.

Services
Whiteman Park station will be served by Transperth Trains operating along the Morley-Ellenbrook line between Perth and Ellenbrook. The projected journey time to Perth is 25 minutes. Whiteman Park station is in fare zone 2. Whiteman Park station is projected to have 3,795 passengers per day in 2031.

References

External links
 Metronet website for information regarding the stations on the Morley–Ellenbrook Line.

Proposed railway stations in Perth, Western Australia
Morley–Ellenbrook line
Whiteman, Western Australia